Heartbroken may refer to:

 Heartbroken (novel), a novel by Lisa Unger
 The Heartbroken, a Canadian indie rock band
 "Heartbroken" (song), a 2007 single by T2
 "Heartbroken", a song by Cathy Carr
 "Heartbroken", a song by Aaliyah from the album One in a Million

See also
Heartbreak (disambiguation)